The 2003 Volta a Catalunya was the 83rd edition of the Volta a Catalunya cycle race and was held from 16 June to 22 June 2003. The race started in Salou and finished in Barcelona. The race was won by José Antonio Pecharromán of the Paternina–Costa de Almería team.

Teams
Fifteen teams of up to eight riders started the race:

 
 
 
 
 
 
 
 
 
 
 
 
 
 Labarca 2–Cafés Baqué

Route

Stages

Stage 1
16 June 2003 - Salou to Vila-seca,  (TTT)

Stage 2
17 June 2003 - Móra d'Ebre to El Morell,

Stage 3
18 June 2003 - La Pobla de Mafumet to Andorra (Els Cortals d'Encamp),

Stage 4
19 June 2003 - Andorra la Vella to Llívia,

Stage 5
20 June 2003 - Llívia to Manresa,

Stage 6
21 June 2003 - Molins de Rei to Vallvidrera,  (ITT)

Stage 7
22 June 2003 - Sant Joan Despí to Barcelona (La Pedrera),

General classification

References

2003
Volta
2003 in Spanish road cycling
June 2003 sports events in Europe